"Hold On" is a song by Australian twin sisters Nervo.  The single was released digitally on 9 April 2013 and is included on their 2015 album, Collateral. Two additional remix extended plays were released in May and June 2013.

"Hold On" peaked at number one of the Hot Dance Club Songs in the United States for the week commencing 22 June 2013. This is the girls first number 1 song on any chart.

Review
Magnetic Mag said; “Hold On is a deep, mood arousing vocal track that combines an atmospheric hook with a big room drop wrapped around that signature Nervo style of production. The pitch bent melody in correlation with the low-end kick and the contrasting intimate vocals makes this track almost impossible not to get into".

Music video
A music video to accompany the release of "Hold On" was first released onto YouTube on 19 April 2013 at a total length of three minutes and forty-four seconds.

Track listing

Chart performance

Weekly charts

Year-end charts

See also
 List of Billboard Dance Club Songs number ones of 2013

References

2013 singles
2013 songs
Nervo (DJs) songs
Astralwerks singles
Song recordings produced by Nervo (DJs)
Songs written by Miriam Nervo
Songs written by Olivia Nervo